The Canal des Pangalanes is a canal that consists of a series of natural rivers, waterways and human-made lakes that extends for over  and runs down the east coast of Madagascar from Mahavelona to Farafangana. It is used primarily for transportation and fishing, and it has unspoiled natural beaches that are visited by tourists. An initial area of the canal in Toamasina (unofficially and in French referred to as Tamatave) is straight, while subsequent areas have curves, lagoons, connected lakes and swamps. Construction efforts began during the era of the Merina monarchy, with major expansion during the French colonial period between 1896 and 1904, and additional expansion during 1949–1957. Construction has included the manual cutting and removal of outcrops to connect previously unconnected areas.

Construction
Initial expansion and maintenance of Canal des Pangalanes during the time of the Merina monarchy (c. 1540–1897), involved cutting through outcrops to connect areas. Significant expansions of the canal were undertaken by France with the support of Joseph Gallieni during the French colonial period between 1896 and 1904 to increase trade, provide a means to supply troops that were located inland, and to provide a safe route for cargo boats destined for Toamasina compared to traveling along the coast of the Indian Ocean. By 1901, an uninterrupted canal existed between Toamasina and Andevoranto, which extended .

Additional construction from 1949 to 1957, cost over 800 million CFA francs to complete.

A study in the 1950s regarding extending the canal for an additional  from Ivondro to Manakara found that the cost would have been at least 1,400 million CFA francs. This proposal was shelved, due to concerns about the high construction costs when the trade between the two areas was low relative to these costs. Population growth not attaining expected numbers in the areas during this time was a factor in the rejection of this extension. Additional objections to this expansion came from businesspeople in Toamasina and Manakara, who voiced concerns about the potential to lose trade at the port of Toamasina. Large navigation companies opposed this extension, to protect the high fees they imposed for cargo loading and unloading at auxiliary ports on the east coast.

Use
Canal des Pangalanes is used by local people: Some of them use canoes for travel and make their homes along its banks. Ferries run up and down navigable areas transporting items such as wood, charcoal, dried fish and other produce. Many local people rely upon the canal for and, for some of them, it is their only means of travel. The canal provides fish for the locals, and cassava is grown along its banks. Coffee factories exist along the canal. Some areas have white, sandy beaches.

A floating museum comprising a library was established in 1999 with the University of Toamasina and the University of Fianarantsoa with the collaboration of the University of Madagascar's Museum of Art and Archaeology operated by the University of Antananarivo.

1980s renovations
After use of the canal decreased, a large project in the 1980s restored and renovated it. The rehabilitation project included dredging areas overrun with silt, the operation of a cargo service enabled by the purchase of a fleet of tug barges, and the construction of warehouses. By 2011 the tug barges were observed to be no longer in use and the warehouses were empty. The tug barges are stored near the pier in Toamasina, where they are rotting.

Pollution
An oil refinery south of Toamasina contributes to pollution in that area of the canal, as evidenced by hyacinths covered with grey-colored slime.

See also

 Lists of canals

References

External links

 Madagascar Travel Guide – includes a map of Canal des Pangalanes

Geography of Madagascar
Canals in Madagascar